Marcel Barbu (October 17, 1907 – November 7, 1984) was a French politician.

Background and earlier life

Born in Nanterre, Hauts-de-Seine, Barbu was deported to Buchenwald concentration camp during the Second World War. Barbu won election in 1945 in the Drôme for a small left-wing party.

French Presidential candidate

In the 1965 French presidential election he ran as an independent candidate and obtained 1.15% of the votes. Barbu claimed to have been mistreated by the press and establishment, and wept at the end of one of his speeches. He is remembered as the candidate of the chiens battus or beaten dogs.

Barbu is remembered as one of a number of widely diverse candidates — from both left and right — who stood against de Gaulle in 1965.

Death

He died in 1984.

See also

 Charles de Gaulle#Second term

1907 births
1984 deaths
People from Nanterre
Politicians from Île-de-France
Members of the Constituent Assembly of France (1945)
Politicians of the French Fifth Republic
French Resistance members